Richard William Pitino (born September 16, 1982) is an American college basketball coach. He is currently the head coach of the New Mexico Lobos men's basketball team. From 2013 to 2021, he was head coach of the University of Minnesota Golden Gophers men's basketball team. He is the son of Iona head coach Rick Pitino. After attending St. Sebastian's School in Needham, Massachusetts, Richard Pitino earned a Bachelor of Arts degree in history at Providence College in 2005. During his time at Providence, Pitino was the manager for the Friars men's basketball team under Tim Welsh. For two years, he also served as an assistant basketball coach for Saint Andrew's School in nearby Barrington, Rhode Island.

Assistant coaching career

In 2004–2005, he worked as an administrative assistant under Tom Herrion at the College of Charleston. In 2005, he was hired by coach Ron Everhart to serve as assistant coach at Northeastern University and followed Everhart to Duquesne University the following year. He was hired on at Louisville in October.  In his first stint with the Cardinals, he helped them advance to back-to-back NCAA Elite Eight appearances.

He left the University of Louisville and accepted a position to work under Billy Donovan at the University of Florida on April 17, 2009. During his time at Florida, they advanced to two NCAA tournaments including one Elite Eight appearance in 2010.

He left Florida on April 12, 2011, to become the associate head coach at Louisville. In his second stint at the school he helped the Cardinals advance to the NCAA Final Four and finish with a 30–10 overall record.

Head coaching career

FIU
Pitino left his position as the associate head coach at Louisville to become the head coach at FIU on April 15, 2012, replacing Isiah Thomas.
  With only six players remaining from the previous season, and not all of them on scholarship, Pitino cobbled together a team and coached a high-pressure defense that finished eighth in the nation in steals. He was able to compile an 18–14 record (11–9 in the Sun Belt conference) in his first season as head coach.  This was FIU's first winning season since 1999–2000 and most wins overall since 1997–98.  His FIU team also had the best conference record in school history. Additionally, FIU reached the Sun Belt Tournament Title game as a four seed, before falling to Western Kentucky in the tournament championship game, 65–63.

Minnesota
On April 3, 2013, despite having only one year of head coaching experience at FIU, Pitino was hired to become the 17th head coach in University of Minnesota history, replacing Tubby Smith.

On April 1, 2014, in Pitino's first season at Minnesota, the Golden Gophers defeated Florida State University 67–64 in overtime in the NIT semifinals, breaking a school record with its 24th win of the season. On April 3, 2014, exactly one year to the date he was hired, Pitino won his first NIT Championship by defeating coach Larry Brown's SMU team 65–63, securing a school record 25th win. The win was the Gophers first NIT championship since 1998 - although that was vacated in 1999 - and their first "official" NIT title since 1993.

Following a historically bad third-year at Minnesota, Coach Pitino orchestrated an impressive turnaround by improving the team's record by 16 wins, utilizing a revamped roster that included five new contributors.  The turnaround helped earn Richard Pitino the Big Ten Coach of the Year award on March 6, 2017.  This was just the second Big Ten coach of the year award in Minnesota school history, and Minnesota's first since 1982.  That season Pitino guided the Gophers to an 11–7 record in the Big Ten, which was Minnesota's most wins in conference in 20 years.

On March 21, 2019, in the first round of the 2019 NCAA Division I men's basketball tournament, No. 10 Minnesota faced No. 7 seed Louisville, a school he previously helped coach and a program which his father Rick had been head coach of for 16 years.  Minnesota defeated the Cardinals 86–76 to move on to the Round of 32.  In the Round of 32, the Gophers lost 70-50 to 2nd-seeded Michigan State Spartans men's basketball team then led by Cassius Winston, who went on to a Final Four appearance after a 68–67 win over the 1st overall seeded Zion Williamson-led Duke team, which notably also consisted of Cam Reddish and R.J. Barrett.

Pitino was fired as head coach after his eighth season by athletic director Mark Coyle, on March 15, 2021, after finishing the season 14–15, 6–14 in the conference. Minnesota was the only Big Ten team to be winless on the road, going 0–10 in the regular season.

New Mexico

2021-2022

On March 17, 2021, less than 24 hours after Pitino was fired by Minnesota, Pitino became the 22nd Head Coach in University of New Mexico program history. Coach Pitino immediately found success in recruiting by attacking the newly invigorated transfer portal. Coach Pitino brought future All-Mountain West performers Jaelen House (Arizona State) and Jamal Mashburn Jr (Minnesota) to Albuquerque as foundational pieces for the program. Under Pitino, UNM brought nine new incoming recruits to Albuquerque in hopes to improve upon a 6–16 record left by the coaching regime the previous year. UNM finished the year at 13-19 and 5-12 in conference play, however, UNM was highly competitive in majority of their games and even beat AP Poll ranked Wyoming Cowboys as Pitino's first signature win in the Duke City.

Head coaching record

References

External links
 Minnesota profile
 Duquesne profile

1982 births
Living people
Basketball coaches from Massachusetts
Duquesne Dukes men's basketball coaches
FIU Panthers men's basketball coaches
Florida Gators men's basketball coaches
Louisville Cardinals men's basketball coaches
Minnesota Golden Gophers men's basketball coaches
Northeastern Huskies men's basketball coaches
Providence College alumni
Sportspeople from Boston